Love Me or Leave Me is a 1955 American biographical romantic musical drama film recounting the life story of Ruth Etting, a singer who rose from dancer to movie star. Nominated for six Academy Awards, the picture stars Doris Day as Etting, James Cagney as gangster Martin "Moe the Gimp" Snyder, her first husband and manager, and Cameron Mitchell as pianist/arranger Johnny Alderman, her second husband. Love Me or Leave Me was written by Daniel Fuchs and Isobel Lennart and directed by Charles Vidor.

Plot
After kicking a customer for his unwelcome attention, 1920s Chicago nightclub singer and dime-a-dance girl Ruth Etting is in jeopardy of losing her job when Martin Snyder intervenes on her behalf. Snyder, known as "The Gimp" to some because of his game leg, owns a laundry business and runs a protection racket, wielding considerable clout.

Etting is desperate to get into show business. Snyder gets her a job dancing in a floor show, then pays for a singing coach, Johnny Alderman, who is also attracted to her.

Etting and Alderman are grateful, but Snyder makes it clear he expects Etting to travel to Miami with him, not for business but for pleasure. Etting declines, but Snyder's interest in her continues. Through an agent, Bernie Loomis, he arranges a radio program to feature Etting, followed by a job with the Ziegfeld Follies. His crude behavior and violent temper cause Etting multiple problems.

Johnny continues to woo Etting, but under heavy pressure from Snyder she marries him instead. His heavy-handed management continues as her successful career develops. Goaded to enter the entertainment business, Snyder decides to open a nightclub of his own. Upset at sensing a relationship resuming between Etting and Johnny during their filming of a Hollywood movie, Snyder strikes her and she ran off and wants a divorce between them. He then catches them together, shoots Johnny and is arrested.

Horrified but conflicted because of all Snyder has done for her career, Etting arranges for Loomis to bail him out of jail. At his neglected nightclub, Snyder arrives to find that Etting is performing there herself. At first enraged by what he perceives as an act of charity, Snyder finally realizes this is Etting's way of showing her appreciation, even if she can't be part of his life any longer.

Cast
 Doris Day as Ruth Etting
 James Cagney as Martin Snyder
 Cameron Mitchell as Johnny Alderman
 Robert Keith as Bernard V. Loomis
 Tom Tully as Frobisher
 Harry Bellaver as Georgie
 Richard Gaines as Paul Hunter
 Peter Leeds as Fred Taylor
 Claude Stroud as Eddie Fulton
 Audrey Young as Jingle Girl
 John Harding as Greg Trent

Production
The role of Snyder was originally intended for Spencer Tracy, but he turned down the project. Cagney suggested to producer Joe Pasternak casting Doris Day in the Etting role, after it was  first offered to Ava Gardner who turned it down. Gardner was subsequently placed on a temporary salary suspension by the studio as a punishment.

Reception
Variety called the film "a rich canvas of the Roaring '20s, with gutsy and excellent performances."

Awards and nominations

The film is recognized by American Film Institute in these lists:
 2002: AFI's 100 Years...100 Passions – Nominated
 2004: AFI's 100 Years...100 Songs:
 "Ten Cents a Dance" – Nominated
 2006: AFI's Greatest Movie Musicals – Nominated

Box-office
According to MGM records the film earned $4,035,000 in the US and Canada and $1,597,000 elsewhere, resulting in a profit of $595,000. Love Me or Leave Me was the eighth ranked movie in 1955.

Soundtrack

All but two of the songs in the movie were hits that Etting had recorded originally back in the 1920s and early 1930s. These new songs, written specifically for the film, are "Never Look Back" by Chilton Price and "I'll Never Stop Loving You" by Nicholas Brodzsky and Sammy Cahn.

The songs as they appear in the film (all sung by Doris Day except as shown):
 "Ten Cents a Dance"
 "I'm Sitting on Top of the World" (sung by Claude Stroud)
 "It All Depends On You"
 "You Made Me Love You"
 "Stay On the Right Side Sister"
 "Everybody Loves My Baby (But My Baby Loves Nobody But Me)"
 "Mean To Me"
 "Sam, the Old Accordion Man"
 "Shaking the Blues Away" (sung by Doris Day, danced by Doris Day and Chorus)
 "I'll Never Stop Loving You"
 "Never Look Back"
 "Five Foot Two, Eyes of Blue"
 "At Sundown"
 "My Blue Heaven"
 "Love Me or Leave Me"

See also
 List of American films of 1955

References

External links 

 
 
 
 

1955 films
1955 romantic drama films
1950s biographical drama films
1950s English-language films
1950s musical drama films
1950s romantic musical films
CinemaScope films
American biographical drama films
American musical drama films
American romantic drama films
American romantic musical films
Biographical films about entertainers
Biographical films about singers
Cultural depictions of American women
Cultural depictions of actors
Cultural depictions of pop musicians
Films directed by Charles Vidor
Films produced by Joe Pasternak
Films scored by Georgie Stoll
Films that won the Academy Award for Best Story
Jukebox musical films
Metro-Goldwyn-Mayer films
Musical films based on actual events
Romance films based on actual events
1950s American films